Sudhandhiram is a 2000 Tamil-language crime action film directed by Raj Kapoor and produced by K. R. Gangadharan. The film stars Arjun and Rambha while Raghuvaran, Raadhika and Sharat Saxena play supporting roles. It is a remake of the Hindi film Ghulam (1998) which itself is based on the 1954 American film On the Waterfront.

Plot 

Vishwa is a goonda and an aspiring boxing champion. He does the typical goonda jobs (like scaring a batsman of the local cricket club to make sure he becomes out) for Sopraj, the local dada. He is usually bailed out by a lawyer Padmini, who believes that there is still good in him and he just needs to be given another chance. Sopraj is aiming to build a colony in the area after vacating the people already living there. Vishwa's brother Raghu, is an accountant on Sopraj's payroll. Love blossoms between Vishwa and Divya, the girlfriend of the head of a local gang. When a social worker Vikram intrudes in the affairs of Sopraj, he asks Vishwa to bring Vikram to him. Vishwa does so thinking that Sopraj is just going to talk some sense into him but Sopraj brutally kills him instead. This makes Vishwa turn over a new leaf. Though his love for his brother prevents him initially, he finally decides to turn approver against Sopraj.

Cast 

 Arjun as Vishwa
 Rambha as Divya
 Raghuvaran as Raghu
 Sharat Saxena as Sopraj (voice dubbed by Salim Ghouse)
 Raadhika as Lawyer Padmini
 Nassar as Sathyamoorthy
 Ranjith as Vikram
 Vivek as Vishwa's friend
 Neena as Neena
 Babloo Prithiveeraj as Charlie
 Ponnambalam as Guna
 Vaiyapuri
 Raj Kapoor as Bharathi
 Master Mahendran
 Chaplin Balu

Soundtrack 
Soundtrack was composed by S. A. Rajkumar and lyrics were written by Kalaikumar.

Release 
The film became a commercial failure at the box office and prompted a legal tussle between actor Arjun and producer K. R. Gangadharan soon after regarding non-payment as per contract. Owing to the success of Mudhalvan (1999) in Telugu, the film's dubbing rights were bought in advance of the original release and a Telugu version titled Bose was released alongside the Tamil film.

References

External links 

2000 films
2000s Tamil-language films
Films directed by Raj Kapoor (Tamil film director)
Films scored by S. A. Rajkumar
Indian crime action films
Indian remakes of American films
Tamil remakes of Hindi films